Niklos is a surname. Notable people with the surname include:

Calix Niklos, character on V Wars
J. R. Niklos (born 1979), American football fullback